Hannah Marks (born April 13, 1993) is an American actress, writer, and director. She played Amanda Brotzman on the television series Dirk Gently's Holistic Detective Agency.

Early life
Hannah Marks was born in Los Angeles, the daughter of Robin Marks and Nova Ball, a former actress, and grew up in San Luis Obispo, California. Hannah's maternal grandfather was entrepreneur and musician Ernie Ball, and one of her maternal great-great-grandfathers was composer Ernest Ball.

Career
Marks appeared in the 2006 feature film Accepted as Lizzie Gaines. She has guest-starred in television programs such as Ugly Betty and Weeds. She was featured in the cover story of the June 4, 2006 issue of The New York Times Magazine with her friend Liana Liberato.

Marks played Tammy in The Runaways, a 2010 biographical film about the 1970s all-girl rock band of the same name.

She has been nominated twice for a Young Artist Award, first for her performance in the film Accepted, and again for her performance in the television series FlashForward.

Marks starred as Amanda Brotzman in the BBC America original Dirk Gently's Holistic Detective Agency.

In July 2017, Marks was named one of Rolling Stone'''s 25 Under 25 Artists Changing the World.

In January 2019, she was named as the director for an upcoming film adaptation of the John Green novel Turtles All the Way Down.

In March 2021, she was named as the director for the upcoming Amazon Studios' film Don't Make Me Go'' starring John Cho.

Filmography

Film

Television

References

External links

1993 births
Living people
21st-century American actresses
21st-century American screenwriters
21st-century American women writers
Actresses from Los Angeles
Actresses from Santa Monica, California
American child actresses
American film actresses
American television actresses
American women screenwriters
Film directors from Los Angeles
People from San Luis Obispo, California
Screenwriters from California
Writers from Los Angeles
Writers from Santa Monica, California